Anastasio Santaella Mendoza (1903 – death unknown), nicknamed "Tacho", was a Cuban infielder in the Negro leagues and the Mexican League.

A native of Havana, Cuba, Santaella made his Negro league debut in 1935 with the New York Cubans, and played with New York again in 1936. A "brilliant infielder", he played in the Mexican League from 1937 to 1948.

References

External links
 and Seamheads

1903 births
Date of birth missing
Year of death missing
Place of death missing
New York Cubans players
Baseball infielders